Deena Lynch (born 12 January 1992), commonly known as Jaguar Jonze, is a Taiwanese-Australian singer, songwriter and multi-instrumentalist
from Brisbane, Queensland. Lynch has additionally worked as a visual artist and a photographer, under the pseudonyms Spectator Jonze and Dusky Jonze, respectively. She is best known for her participations in Australia Decides 2020 and 2022, where she placed 6th and 3rd respectively.

2012–2017: Early career 

Deena Lynch was born in Yokohama, Japan to a Taiwanese mother and Australian father. She relocated to Australia at age seven. As a child, she experienced abuse and was later diagnosed with complex post-traumatic stress disorder. By 2009, she was based in Brisbane.

In 2012, Lynch released her first album, Lone Wolf, as Deena and in 2015 followed with a second album, Black Cat, which included the single "Cupid". For the latter album she provided vocals, acoustic guitar, keyboards and organ; she was assisted by Joe Fallon on electric guitar and organ; Jack Killalea on bass guitar and guitar; Luke Sampson on drums and percussion. In 2015, she also released the single "Turpentine". All albums and singles under the performance name Deena, were removed from her streaming services, however some albums remained physically available in stores in 2020. Her two music videos under Deena, "Cupid" and "Turpentine", remain unlisted on YouTube.

2018–present: Later career 

In 2018 Lynch released her first single under the stage name Jaguar Jonze, "You Got Left Behind". She released three more singles, "Beijing Baby", "Kill Me with Your Love", and "Rabbit Hole" during 2019 to 2020. These were included on the extended play, Diamonds & Liquid Gold, alongside two new tracks, "Rising Sun", and the title track. During 2019, as Spectator Jonze, she displayed her visual artworks at the Brisbane Street Art Festival, and in the following year she was a finalist for the Brisbane Portrait Prize with Deena IX: Waking the Tiger. She developed the photographer persona, Dusky Jonze, as "a dialogue with the body".

In February 2020, Jaguar Jonze was a contestant on Australia Decides, entering "Rabbit Hole" to compete for Australia's Eurovision entry. She came 6th place, with 46 points. Lynch released a cover version of Britney Spears' song "Toxic". While in New York, Lynch cut short her American tour and returned to Australia in mid-March, to land in Sydney, where she was diagnosed with COVID-19. Later that year, she released two more singles, "Deadalive" and "Murder".

In November 2020, Lynch was commissioned by Christian Louboutin to create a concept film, visual artworks and photos featuring herself, in collaboration with Louboutin's Fall/Winter 2020 Cube Collection.

In early 2021, she issued her first singles of the year, "Astronaut", and "Curled In", both accompanied by a music video.

On 16 April 2021, Lynch released her sophomore EP, "Antihero", containing her four previous singles as well as one new track.

On 8 October 2021, she released "Who Died and Made You King?". Later that month, it was announced that she would be competing in Australia Decides 2022, later revealed to be with her 2022 single "Little Fires". She won the jury vote placing 3rd overall.

Jaguar Jonze released her album "BUNNY MODE" on 3 June 2022. A survivor of sexual assault, Jonze described writing ‘Bunny Mode’ as a “cathartic process”.

Discography

Studio albums

Extended plays

Singles

As lead artist

As featured artist

Videography

Awards and nominations

AIR Awards
The Australian Independent Record Awards (commonly known informally as AIR Awards) is an annual awards night to recognise, promote and celebrate the success of Australia's Independent Music sector.

! 
|-
| 2021
| Deena Lynch (Jaguar Jonze)
| 2021 Outstanding Achievement Award
| 
| 
|-
| 2022
| "Who Died and Made You King?"
| Independent Song of the Year
| 
|

J Awards
The J Awards are an annual series of Australian music awards that were established by the Australian Broadcasting Corporation's youth-focused radio station Triple J. They commenced in 2005.

! 
|-
| J Awards of 2020
| Jaguar Jonze
| Unearthed Artist of the Year
| 
| 
|-
| J Awards of 2021
| Jaguar Jonze
| You Done Good Award
| 
|

Queensland Music Awards
The Queensland Music Awards (previously known as Q Song Awards) are annual awards celebrating Queensland, Australia's brightest emerging artists and established legends. They commenced in 2006.
 
|-
| 2020
| Jaguar Jonze
| Singer / Songwriter
| 
|-
| 2021
| Jaguar Jonze
| Singer / Songwriter
| 
|-

Rolling Stone Australia Awards
The Rolling Stone Australia Awards are awarded annually in January or February by the Australian edition of Rolling Stone magazine for outstanding contributions to popular culture in the previous year.

! 
|-
| 2021
| Jaguar Jonze
| Best New Artist
| 
| 
|-

References

External links
 
 

1992 births
21st-century Australian singers
21st-century Australian women singers
21st-century Taiwanese singers
Australian women singer-songwriters
Australian singer-songwriters
Living people
Taiwanese women singers
Taiwanese singer-songwriters